The 2018–19 UEFA Champions League knockout phase began on 12 February and ended on 1 June 2019 with the final at the Metropolitano Stadium in Madrid, Spain, to decide the champions of the 2018–19 UEFA Champions League. A total of 16 teams competed in the knockout phase.

For the first time, the video assistant referee (VAR) system was used in the Champions League knockout phase.

Times are CET/CEST, as listed by UEFA (local times, if different, are in parentheses).

Round and draw dates
The schedule was as follows (all draws were held at the UEFA headquarters in Nyon, Switzerland).

Format
Each tie in the knockout phase, apart from the final, was played over two legs, with each team playing one leg at home. The team that scored more goals on aggregate over the two legs advanced to the next round. If the aggregate score was level, the away goals rule was applied, i.e. the team that scored more goals away from home over the two legs advanced. If away goals were also equal, then extra time was played. The away goals rule was again applied after extra time, i.e. if there were goals scored during extra time and the aggregate score was still level, the visiting team advanced by virtue of more away goals scored. If no goals were scored during extra time, the winners were decided by a penalty shoot-out. In the final, which was played as a single match, if the score was level at the end of normal time, extra time was played, followed by a penalty shoot-out if the score was still level.

The mechanism of the draws for each round was as follows:
In the draw for the round of 16, the eight group winners were seeded, and the eight group runners-up were unseeded. The seeded teams were drawn against the unseeded teams, with the seeded teams hosting the second leg. Teams from the same group or the same association could not be drawn against each other.
In the draws for the quarter-finals and semi-finals, there were no seedings, and teams from the same group or the same association could be drawn against each other. As the draws for the quarter-finals and semi-finals were held together before the quarter-finals were played, the identity of the quarter-final winners was not known at the time of the semi-final draw. A draw was also held to determine which semi-final winner was designated as the "home" team for the final (for administrative purposes as it was played at a neutral venue).

For the quarter-finals and semi-finals, teams from the same city (e.g., Manchester City and Manchester United) were not scheduled to play at home on the same day or on consecutive days, due to logistics and crowd control. To avoid such scheduling conflict, if the two teams were drawn to play at home for the same leg, the order of legs of the tie involving the team with the lower domestic ranking in the qualifying season (e.g., Manchester United for this season) was reversed from the original draw.

Qualified teams
The knockout phase involved the 16 teams which qualified as winners and runners-up of each of the eight groups in the group stage.

Bracket

Round of 16
The draw for the round of 16 was held on 17 December 2018, 12:00 CET.

Manchester United became the first team in UEFA Champions League history to advance after losing at home by two goals or more in the first leg. Including the European Cup era, only Ajax managed this feat, winning a play-off match they forced in the 1968–69 European Cup quarter-finals against Benfica after losing 1–3 in the first leg at home and winning 3–1 in the second leg away.

Summary
The first legs were played on 12, 13, 19 and 20 February, and the second legs were played on 5, 6, 12 and 13 March 2019.

|}

Matches

Manchester City won 10–2 on aggregate.

Juventus won 3–2 on aggregate.

3–3 on aggregate; Manchester United won on away goals.

Tottenham Hotspur won 4–0 on aggregate.

Barcelona won 5–1 on aggregate.

Porto won 4–3 on aggregate.

Ajax won 5–3 on aggregate.

Liverpool won 3–1 on aggregate.

Quarter-finals
The draw for the quarter-finals was held on 15 March 2019, 12:00 CET.

Summary
The first legs were played on 9 and 10 April, and the second legs were played on 16 and 17 April 2019.

|}
Notes

Matches

Ajax won 3–2 on aggregate.

Liverpool won 6–1 on aggregate.

4–4 on aggregate; Tottenham Hotspur won on away goals.

Barcelona won 4–0 on aggregate.

Semi-finals
The draw for the semi-finals was held on 15 March 2019, 12:00 CET (after the quarter-final draw). Both semi-finals are considered to be among the best comebacks in UEFA Champions League history.

Summary
The first legs were played on 30 April and 1 May, and the second legs were played on 7 and 8 May 2019.

|}

Matches

3–3 on aggregate; Tottenham Hotspur won on away goals.

Liverpool won 4–3 on aggregate.

In the first leg at Camp Nou, Barcelona defeated Liverpool 3–0, with goals coming from former Liverpool player Luis Suárez and a brace from Lionel Messi; Liverpool missed several chances to score.

Barcelona went into the second leg after a 2–0 loss to Celta Vigo in La Liga, though they had rested all of the players that started this match, with the exception of Arturo Vidal, having already won the title. Liverpool, on the other hand, were in an intense Premier League title race with Manchester City and needed a win to keep up the pressure. An 86th-minute winning goal from substitute Divock Origi helped them defeat Newcastle United 3–2 at St James' Park. Ahead of the second leg, Mohamed Salah and Roberto Firmino were ruled out for Liverpool through injury, while Barcelona's Ousmane Dembélé suffered an injury against Celta Vigo and was ruled out for the remainder of the season.

Liverpool started the match as the better side, as Divock Origi opened the scoring seven minutes in after Jordan Henderson's shot was saved by Marc-André ter Stegen, and the Belgian capitalised with a tap-in on the follow up. Barcelona had several chances in the first half, but Alisson of Liverpool made crucial saves to keep Liverpool in the tie. Nine minutes into the second half Georginio Wijnaldum made it 2–0 after Trent Alexander-Arnold's deflected cross came into his path and he smashed it into the net. 122 seconds later the Dutch international got his second and Liverpool's third with a header after Xherdan Shaqiri's cross. Divock Origi won the tie after Trent Alexander-Arnold took a quick corner and Origi got the fourth as he reacted quickest to the ball.

The match is considered to be one of the greatest comebacks in UEFA Champions League history. Liverpool's manager Jürgen Klopp described it as a "very special night", whilst Barcelona head coach Ernesto Valverde admitted that Liverpool "rolled them over". Jürgen Klopp described the match as special and unforgettable, and Valverde said: "They have been really strong, they played really well. We've got to congratulate them on the performance they put up in the tie as a whole. "It is a terrible result for our fans and for ourselves. We didn't expect a situation like this. This is what has happened to us. It is really, really unfortunate but credit is due to Liverpool." Liverpool's Virgil van Dijk added to that in saying "We always believed that we could pull of a miracle."

Five days later, Liverpool wrapped up their Premier League campaign with a 2–0 win over Wolverhampton Wanderers, finishing with 97 points, in second place behind Manchester City who got 98 points. Liverpool's Sadio Mané and Mohamed Salah both collected the Golden Boot, also joint with Arsenal's Pierre-Emerick Aubameyang with 22 goals each.
The Reds then won the UEFA Champions League for the sixth time in their history, defeating Tottenham Hotspur 2–0 in the final.

Barcelona's manager Ernesto Valverde was sacked in January 2020 and many fans believe that the 4–0 loss was the catalyst for the sacking.
Barcelona finished up their La Liga season with a 2–0 win over Getafe at home before a 2–2 draw at Eibar on the final day. They then lost the Copa del Rey final against Valencia.

Final

The final was played on 1 June 2019 at the Metropolitano Stadium in Madrid. The "home" team (for administrative purposes) was determined by an additional draw held after the quarter-final and semi-final draws.

Notes

References

External links

Knockout Phase
2018-19
February 2019 sports events in Europe
March 2019 sports events in Europe
April 2019 sports events in Europe
May 2019 sports events in Europe
June 2019 sports events in Europe